Alaa' Walid Bashir Maflah Al-Shaqran is a Jordanian footballer who plays for Al-Hussein and the Jordan national football team.

Honors and Participation in International Tournaments

In Pan Arab Games 
2011 Pan Arab Games

In WAFF Championships 
2008 WAFF Championship

References
 Al-Ramtha SC Includes Alaa' Al-Shaqran for 20,000 Dollars
 Alaa' Al-Shaqran: "Al-Ramtha SC Will Return to Winning Titles and Qualifying for Brazil 2014 Depends on Winning" 
 Alaa' Al-Shaqran: "Playing on a National Team is a Desire for Every Player in the World!"
 Alaa' Al-Shaqran Signs Up For Hajer

External links
 
 
 

1987 births
Living people
Jordanian footballers
Jordan international footballers
Expatriate footballers in Syria
Jordanian expatriate footballers
Expatriate footballers in Saudi Arabia
Association football midfielders
2011 AFC Asian Cup players
Hajer FC players
Al-Ramtha SC players
Shabab Al-Ordon Club players
Al-Hussein SC (Irbid) players
Al-Wahda SC (Syria) players
Saudi Professional League players
Syrian Premier League players